Guseman is an unincorporated community in Preston County, in the U.S. state of West Virginia.

History
A post office called Guseman was established in 1883, and remained in operation until 1909. The community has the name of Jacob Guseman, an early settler.

References

Unincorporated communities in Preston County, West Virginia
Unincorporated communities in West Virginia